Mulux (also, Mulukh) is a village in the Ismailli Rayon of Azerbaijan.  The village forms part of the municipality of Cülyan.

References 

Populated places in Ismayilli District